Koutsopodi is a town and a former municipality in Argolis, Peloponnese, Greece. Since the 2011 local government reform it is part of the municipality Argos-Mykines, of which it is a municipal unit. The municipal unit has an area of 121.069 km2. Population 3,272 (2011). The Legendary Greek American professional wrestler Christos Theofilou (Jim Londos) was born and raised here.

References

Populated places in Argolis